Shurab-e Jahan (also Romanized as Shūrāb-e Jahān; also known as Shūrāb and Shūrāb-e Soflá) is a village in Bala Jam Rural District, Nasrabad District, Torbat-e Jam County, Razavi Khorasan Province, Iran. At the 2006 census, its population was 83, in 16 families.

References 

Populated places in Torbat-e Jam County